Laya (born 21 October 1981) is an Indian actress and Kuchipudi dancer known for her work primarily in Telugu films alongside a few Malayalam, Kannada and Tamil films. Laya first appeared as a child actor in Bhadram Koduko (1992) and later she started working as a lead actress with Swayamvaram (1999). She won two Nandi Awards for Best Actress in consecutive years for Manoharam (2000) and Preminchu (2001).

Personal life
Laya was born on 21 October 1981 in a Telugu Bramhin family in Vijayawada, Andhra Pradesh. She attended Nirmala High School, Vijayawada. Her mother was a music teacher in Nirmala High School, Vijayawada and her father was a doctor. During her school days, she was a state level Chess player. Later, she moved to Hyderabad and participated in multiple stage shows as a classical dancer, having performed in more than 50 stage shows. She has a bachelor's degree in Computer Applications. She married Dr. Sri Ganesh Gorty in 2006 and settled in Los Angeles, California. The couple has a daughter, Sloka and a son, Vachan.

Filmography

Film

Television 

Mega Bangaram Mee Kosam - 1 on Gemini TV as a host
Sambavi on ETV
Padutha Theeyaga on ETV as a host

Awards and nominations
Nandi Awards
Special Jury Award - Swayamvaram (1999)
Best Actress - Manoharam (2000)
Best Actress - Preminchu Preminchu (2001)

References

External links
 
 

Indian film actresses
Actresses in Malayalam cinema
Living people
Nandi Award winners
Actresses in Telugu cinema
Actresses in Tamil cinema
Actresses in Kannada cinema
Actresses from Vijayawada
Indian child actresses
21st-century Indian actresses
20th-century Indian actresses
Child actresses in Telugu cinema
Actresses in Telugu television
Telugu actresses
1981 births